is an old neighbourhood located next to south Osaka City's downtown "Minami" area. The neighbourhood was created in 1912 with New York (specifically, Coney Island) as a model for its southern half and Paris for its northern half. At this location, a Luna Park amusement park operated from 1912 until it closed in 1923. The centrepiece of the neighbourhood was Tsutenkaku Tower (the "tower reaching to heaven").

As a result of minimal redevelopment after World War II, the area has become one of Japan's poorest.

History and reputation

Despite its negative image and commonly held reputation as Osaka's most dangerous area, Shinsekai boasts a colourful history and unique identity. At the beginning of the 20th century the neighbourhood flourished as a local tourist attraction showcasing the city's modern image. After World War II, the area served to entertain the laborers who were rebuilding Osaka. Shinsekai's status as a dangerous area owes much to criminal activity that flourished in the decades before the 1990s.

Whether the stigma surrounding Shinsekai is deserved is open to debate. Many Osakans claim to be afraid to set foot in the area. The travel guide Lonely Planet Japan, warns visitors to "keep their wits about them" as Shinsekai may be the "closest thing in Japan to a dangerous neighbourhood". Although in the 15th edition of this travel guide, published in 2017, this is not mentioned anymore. 

Continuing the area's chequered fortunes of recent years, in place of rampant criminality, Osaka's large permanent settlement of homeless has taken root in the areas around Shinsekai. Homeless men, often elderly, from all over Japan come to Osaka to escape the stigma of hometown societal shame and wander the streets around the area. The neighbourhood is also home to a large presence of prostitutes and a concentration of Osaka's cross-dressing community.

Attractions

Though its elements of seediness and destitution are often highlighted, Shinsekai is also home to a large number of legitimate business outlets. It is the scene of low-cost restaurants, cheap clothing stores, cinemas, shogi and mahjong clubs, and pachinko parlours.

Shinsekai has several fugu (blowfish) restaurants, but the neighbourhood's real culinary forte is kushi-katsu. The neighbourhood abounds with kushi-katsu restaurants offering various kinds of meat, fish, and vegetables all breaded and deep fried on small sticks for around  each.

Shinsekai lies west of Tennoji Zoo, Tennoji Park, and the Osaka Municipal Museum of Art. To the south is Spa World and the now-closed Festival Gate, a compact amusement park built to rejuvenate Osaka's most run-down area. Instead of trying to blend the park into Shinsekai, its construction resulted in virtually barricading it from the surrounding neighbourhood. It remained open for nearly seven years but in February 2004 a joint-venture behind the operation went into bankruptcy, effectively shutting down the complex for the most part. As an amusement space, it was no match for nearby Universal Studios Japan, which opened in 2002.  In early 2008, the city began calling for tenders from prospective buyers although, by this point, a crepe shop adjoining Spa World was the only business still operating in the empty complex.

The top of Tsutenkaku Tower provides a panoramic and unobstructed view of Osaka.

Access
 JR West Osaka Loop Line, Shin-Imamiya Station, East Exit (10-minute walk)
 Nankai Railway Nankai Line, Shin-Imamiya Station, East Exit (10-minute walk)
 Nankai Railway Koya Line, Shin-Imamiya Station, East Exit (10-minute walk)
 Osaka Municipal Subway Sakaisuji Line (brown line), Ebisucho Station, Exit 3 (3-minute walk)
 Osaka Municipal Subway Midosuji Line (red line), Dobutsuen-mae Station, Exit 5 (10-minute walk)
 Hankai Tramway Hankai Line, Ebisucho Station (3-minute walk)

See also
 Tobita Shinchi
 Kamagasaki Day Laborers' District

References

External links
 the fit shinsekai　("Shinsekai" HP steering Committee)
 Shinsekai and Tsutenkaku Article by Hiroaki Sasaki, tour guide
 Mother's Day Story about a walk through Shinsekai/Kamagasaki by Don MacLaren, published September, 2009 in the literary magazine Danse Macabre

Geography of Osaka
Tourist attractions in Osaka
Restaurant districts and streets in Japan